Nikita Sergeyevich Kolesnikov (born 12 August 1988) is a former Russian professional football player.

Club career
He played in the Russian Football National League for FC Dynamo Saint Petersburg in 2010.

Personal life
He is a son of FC Zenit masseur Sergey Kolesnikov.

External links
 
 

1988 births
Footballers from Saint Petersburg
Living people
Russian footballers
Association football midfielders
FC Zenit Saint Petersburg players
FC Dynamo Saint Petersburg players